Alipada is a village to the north of Chilika Lake. It comes under Puri District.

References

Villages in Puri district